Saints Daniel and Verda (died 344) were Christian martyrs under King Shapur II of Persia.
Their feast day is 21 February.

Monks of Ramsgate account

The monks of St Augustine's Abbey, Ramsgate wrote in their Book of Saints (1921),

Butler's account

The hagiographer Alban Butler (1710–1773) wrote in his Lives of the Fathers, Martyrs, and Other Principal Saints under February 21,

See also
 Martyrs of Persia under Shapur II

Notes

Sources

 
 

Groups of Christian martyrs of the Roman era
Persian saints
4th-century Christian saints
Christians in the Sasanian Empire
344 deaths